Badu may refer to:

People
 Badu (surname)
 Emmanuel Agyemang-Badu, "Badu" (born 1990), professional footballer
 Erykah Badu (born Erica Abi Wright 1971), American singer

Places

China
 Badu, Fujian (八都镇), town in Jiaocheng District, Ningde
 Badu, Jiangxi (八都镇), town in Jishui County
 Badu, Zhejiang (八都镇), town in Longquan

Other places
 Badu Island, Queensland, Australia
Badu Island Airport, which serves that island
Badu, Queensland, the town on Badu Island
 Badu River, a tributary of the Prut River in Romania
 Badu, Niterói, a neighbourhood of Niterói, Rio de Janeiro, Brazil
 Badu, West Bengal, a suburb in the North 24 Parganas district of West Bengal, India
 Badu, Ghana, a town in the Tain District of Ghana

Other uses
Badu Building, Llano, Texas, US
 Bedouin or Badu, a predominantly desert-dwelling Arab ethnic group